Qaleh-ye Showkat (also Romanized as Qal‘eh-ye Showkat; also known as Qal‘eh-ye Showkat Nez̧ām) is a village in Howmeh Rural District, in the Central District of Shahrud County, Semnan Province, Iran. At the 2006 census, its population was 332, in 91 families.

References 

Populated places in Shahrud County